Demand controlled ventilation (DCV) is a feedback control method to maintain indoor air quality that automatically adjusts the ventilation rate provided to a space in response to changes in conditions such as occupant number or indoor pollutant concentration. The control strategy is mainly intended to reduce the energy use by heating, cooling, and ventilation systems compared to buildings that use open-loop controls with constant ventilation rates.

Common reference standards for ventilation:

 ISO ICS 91.140.30: Ventilation and air-conditioning systems
 ASHRAE 62.1 & 62.2: The standards for Ventilation and Indoor Air Quality

Examples of estimating occupancy 
 Timed schedules
 Motion sensors (various technologies including: Audible sound, inaudible sound, infrared)
 Gas detection In a survey on Norwegian schools, using CO2 sensors for DCV was found to reduce energy consumption by 62% when compared with a constant air volume (CAV) ventilation system.
 Positive control gates
 Ticket sales
 Security equipment data share (including people counting video software)
 Inference from other system sensors/equipment, like smart meters

Carbon dioxide sensing
Carbon dioxide sensors monitor carbon dioxide levels in a space by strategic placement. The placement of the sensors should be able to provide an accurate representation of the space, usually placed in a return duct or on the wall. As the sensor reads the increasing amount of carbon dioxide levels in a space, the ventilation increases to dilute the levels. When the space is unoccupied, the sensor reads normal levels, and continues to supply the unoccupying rate for airflow. The amount of air supplied is determined by the building owner standards, along with the designer and ASHRAE Standard 62.1.

References 

Heating, ventilation, and air conditioning